Olderdalen is the administrative centre of the municipality of Gáivuotna – Kåfjord – Kaivuono in Troms og Finnmark county, Norway.  Olderdalen is located in the Olderdalen valley along the Kåfjorden with a view of the Lyngen Alps.  The village has a ferry connection to Lyngseidet, the administrative centre of Lyngen Municipality, across the fjord.  The European route E6 highway passes through this village also.

Kåfjord Church is located in this village.

Economy
The Olderdalen area is home to mainly farming and fishing.  Raising sheep and dairy cattle are two of the most prominent types of agriculture in the area.  There is also grocery services as well as public and private services.

History
During World War II many of the houses and farms in Olderdalen fell victim of the German scorched earth tactics when they withdrew from Finland and Finnmark. This led to much of the infrastructure and buildings in the village being destroyed to prevent the invading Soviet forces from obtaining supplies.

References

Villages in Troms
Populated places of Arctic Norway
Gáivuotna–Kåfjord